CSR 97.4FM is a community radio station based in Canterbury, England. It was funded by the University of Kent and Canterbury Christ Church University, as well as their associated Student Unions. The radio station broadcasts from studios at both universities 24 hours a day, with live broadcasting from 0700 to 23:59. Despite being primarily aimed at students, it is not purely a student radio station. CSRfm was the first student-led community radio station in the country to acquire a licence.

On 8 June 2020, CSR stopped broadcasting, temporarily, due to COVID-19. The SU transferred the licence from Canterbury Youth And Student Media Ltd to Kent Union Trading Ltd, then immediately handed back to Ofcom by Kent Union.

History 
Student Radio has existed in Canterbury since 1966, initially on an unlicensed basis. In 1967, UKC Radio started broadcasting legally on an AM licence which covered the University of Kent campus only. Canterbury Christ Church University also had a student radio station, C4 Radio, broadcasting on AM on a similar strictly contained basis.

When Restricted Service Licences (RSLs) became available both stations periodically took advantage of the scheme to gain citywide coverage on FM, albeit only for short periods. Each station allowed the other some airtime during their RSLs.

Canterbury Christ Church University's first RSL broadcast occurred in 2002, under the then Station Manager, Jim Cohen. Test broadcasts established that most of the city could pick up the radio station as well as certain parts of the surrounding countryside. The RSL broadcast lasted 2 weeks and was generally considered to be a great success.

The two student unions, which operated these radio stations, decided to make a single combined bid for the Canterbury community radio licence and were successful. In order to apply for the licence Canterbury Youth Student Media (CYSM) Ltd. was set up which has directors compromising of members of both universities and their unions and also the executive committee members, as well as external directors. The station launched on 15 January 2007

On 22 July 2011 the station announced that it had been successful with its first licence extension application, allowing it to broadcast for another 5 years until 2017. Furthermore, on 19 August 2016, the station again announced a second licence extension application had been successful, allowing it to broadcast for a further 5 years until 2022.

Funding 
CSRfm is funded by donations from four funding bodies:
The University of Kent
Canterbury Christ Church University
Kent Union
Christ Church Students Union

Awards 
Since CSRfm launched in 2007, both the station and its presenters, have been honoured with many national Student Radio Awards.

SRA Awards

The station has also been honoured with a number of awards at the I LOVE STUDENT RADIO ceremony, which takes place each year at the National Student Radio Association Conference. In 2015 and 2016 CSR was also the most nominated station at the awards.

In 2016 the Community Media Association launched the Community Radio Awards, the first ceremony was held at Birmingham City University.

CSRfm also hosts its own awards evenings in collaboration with InQuire Media and Kent Television - both being the other arms of Student Media at the University of Kent. These awards are judged by experts and professionals from across the media industry including established radio DJs, producers, journalists, filmmakers, directors and so on.

References

External links 
CSR 97.4FM (Canterbury's local Community & Student Radio Station)

Student radio in the United Kingdom
Radio stations in Kent
Radio stations established in 2007
University of Kent
Canterbury Christ Church University
Community radio stations in the United Kingdom
City of Canterbury